Edward Ashworth (1814 – 1896) was an English artist and architect from Devon, England, considered to be the West Country's leading ecclesiastical architect.  He was elected a member of the Exeter Diocesan Architectural Society in 1847.

Origins

He was born in 1814 at Colleton Barton, in the parish of Chulmleigh in Devon.

Career
He left Colleton in 1822 and later moved to London where he became a pupil of the architect Charles Fowler (1792-1867), born in Collumpton, Devon. During 1842-46 Ashworth travelled in New Zealand, Australia, Timor, Macau and Hong Kong during which time he kept diaries and sketchbooks. Following his return to England in 1846 he set up an architectural practice in Exeter, Devon. In later life he lived at Dix's Field in Exeter. He rebuilt or restored many churches in Devon, including:

Rebuilding works
Cullompton, Devon (1849)
Dulverton, Somerset (1852-5)
Bideford, Devon (1859)
Lympstone, Devon (1862)
St Mary's, Bideford, Devon (1862-5)
Withycombe Raleigh, Exmouth, Devon (1863-4)
St Mary Major, Exeter, Devon (1865), now demolished
Topsham (1874)
Milton Combe (1878)
St Nicholas Church, Exeter (opposite St Nicholas Priory) (design of)

Restoration works
St Michael and All Angels Church, Bude, Cornwall
St Peter's Church, Tiverton, Devon
Silverton
Lapford
Widecombe
Axminster
Doddiscombsleigh
North Molton
Wynards Almshouses, Exeter (1863)

Literary works
Chinese Architecture (1851), with his illustrations

Paintings and drawings

Many of his drawings and paintings are held in the collection of the  Westcountry Studies Library, Exeter, at the Devon and Exeter Institution and Devon Record Office.

Death and burial
He died on 8 March 1896 and left a substantial estate valued at £26,814, mainly invested in Railway stocks. He was buried in the newly created Higher Cemetery, Exeter, for which he had designed two lodges and one chapel. His ornate stone cross, made of pink stone, survives and was restored circa 2010.

Notes

References

Bury, Richard M.B., History of Colleton Barton, 1993

1814 births
1896 deaths
19th-century English painters
English male painters
19th-century English architects
English ecclesiastical architects
Artists from Exeter
19th-century English male artists
Architects from Exeter